Brevundimonas halotolerans is a Gram-negative and bacteroid-shaped bacterium from the genus of Brevundimonas which has been isolated from brackish water from the Carkeek Park in the United States.

References

Bacteria described in 2010
Caulobacterales